Crn Kamen is a village in the municipality of Vinica, North Macedonia.

Demographics
According to the 2002 census, the village had a total of 107 inhabitants. Ethnic groups in the village include:

Macedonians 107

References

Villages in Vinica Municipality, North Macedonia